The 1983 Rice Owls football team was an American football team that represented Rice University in the Southwest Conference during the 1983 NCAA Division I-A football season. In their sixth year under head coach Ray Alborn, the team compiled a 1–10 record.

Schedule

References

Rice
Rice Owls football seasons
Rice Owls football